Ghaspani I Legislative Assembly constituency is one of the 60 Legislative Assembly constituencies of Nagaland state in India.

Previously part of Dimapur District, it is now part of Chümoukedima District and Niuland District. It is reserved for candidates belonging to the Scheduled Tribes.

Members of the Legislative Assembly

Election results

2018

2013

2008

See also
 List of constituencies of the Nagaland Legislative Assembly
 Dimapur district

References

Chümoukedima district
Assembly constituencies of Nagaland